"Schoolin'" is a song from British indie pop band Everything Everything. The track was released in the United Kingdom on 13 June 2010 as the fourth single from the band's debut studio album, Man Alive (2010).

The song came with an animated music video, animated by Nicos Livesey.

Track listing

Charts
For the chart week dated 26 June 2010, "Schoolin'" debuted at number one hundred and fifty-two on the UK Singles Chart—marking the band's first appearance on the chart.

Weekly charts

Release history

References

2010 singles
Everything Everything songs
Animated music videos
2010 songs
Songs written by Jonathan Higgs
Geffen Records singles